Timothy E. Brindle (born November 7, 1980), is an American Christian hip hop lyricist signed to Lamp Mode Recordings. He is also a preacher and teacher of the Gospel of Jesus Christ, and the Senior Admissions Counselor at Westminster Theological Seminary in Philadelphia, where he is a Ph.D. Student in Old Testament. His music and speaking ministry seeks "to make known the Glory of Christ from Genesis to Revelation."

Early life
Brindle was born Timothy Edward Brindle, in Pittsburgh, Pennsylvania on November 7, 1980.

Personal life
He is married, his wife is Floriana, whose family is from Angola. Her parents fled the country because of the Angolan Civil War so that Floriana was born in a refugee camp in Botswana, but she moved to the United States city of Philadelphia, when she was just four with her family. They reside together in Philadelphia with their 8 children.

Timothy studies at Westminster Theological Seminary, where he completed the Master of Divinity program in 2016. He  began the Th.M. in Old Testament that year, and is now a student in the Ph.D. program in Old Testament at Westminster where he serves full-time as the Senior Admissions Counselor.

Music career
Timothy Brindle was the first artist on Lamp Mode Recordings, when the label began in 2003. Lamp Mode released The Great Awakening in 2003, then a re-release in 2005, which celebrates the new birth of God's Sovereign Monergistic Regeneration. His second album, inspired by John's Owen's Mortification of Sin book, is called Killing Sin and was released in 2005.The Restoration was released in 2012, and the following year Timothy Brindle collaborated with Stephen the Levite and Zae da Blacksmith to form a group called "The Collective" in which they released an album in 2013 by that name in order to fund their European Mission Trip. The Restoration charted on one Billboard chart. Wade-O Radio said "This album was a lyrical masterpiece."  On April 20, 2018 Brindle released another album titled The Unfolding.  The album's focus was the theme of redemption, from the Old to New Testament, as found in the Bible.  In The Unfolding Brindle asserts that redemptive history finds its culmination and fulfillment in Jesus Christ.  The Unfolding was available in digital as well as print formats and was accompanied by a 400 page book of the same title.

Discography

Studio albums

References

1980 births
Living people
American male rappers
Musicians from Pennsylvania
American performers of Christian hip hop music
Rappers from Philadelphia
21st-century American rappers
21st-century American male musicians